Bestial Mockery is a Swedish black metal band formed in Uddevalla, Sweden, in 1995 by the quartet of Carl "Master Motorsåg" Bildt, Micke "Doomanfanger" Petersson, Jocke "Christcrusher" and Carl "Warslaughter". The band's stated aim at that time was to "channel perverted lusts for Satanic bloody Metal". Although they split up in 2008, Bestial Mockery released four full-length albums for Metal Blood Music, Osmose and Season of Mist, as well as a large number of stand-alone EPs and shared releases with other underground metal acts. In a review of Slaying the Life in Decibel magazine, a similarity between the band and Nunslaughter was noted.

As of November 11, 2011, the band is active again.

Line-up

Last known line-up
 Carl "Master Motorsåg" Bildt (vocals)
Rob Devilpig Mastodont Wartones    
 Micke "Doomanfanger" Petersson (guitar)
 Aggressive Perfector (guitar)
 Carl Warslaughter (drums)

Former line-ups
 Ted Bundy (guitar)
 Sir Torment (bass)
 Fjant Sodomizer (bass)
 Anti-Fred-Rik (bass)
 Jocke Christcrusher (bass)
 Rob DevilPig (bass)

Discography

Demos
 Battle Promo (1996)
 Christcrushing Hammerchainsaw (1997)
 Chainsaw Demons Return (1998)
 War: The Final Solution (2000)
 Sepulchral Wrath (2006)

LPs
 Christcrushing Hammerchainsaw (Metal Blood Music, 2002; re-released by Hell's Headbangers, 2009)
 Evoke the Desecrator (Osmose, 2003)
 Gospel of the Insane (Osmose, 2006)
 Slaying the Life (Season of Mist, 2007)

EPs
 Live for Violence, split cassette with Lust (Impaler of Trendies, 1999)
 Nuclear Goat / Joyful Dying, split 7-inch with Suicidal Winds (2000)
 A Sign of Satanic Victory (Warlord, 2002)
 Tribute to I-17, split with Axis Powers (Agonia, 2004)
 Outbreak of Evil, split with Nocturnal, Vomitor and Toxic Holocaust (Witching Metal Reckords, 2004)
 Eve of the Bestial Massacre, split with Unholy Massacre (Deathstrike, 2005; re-released by Agonia, 2006)
 Poison of the Underground, split with Force of Darkness (Turanian Honour, 2007)
 Metal of Death, split with Destruktor (Hell's Headbangers, 2007)
 Hail Occult Masters, split with Karnarium (Hell's Headbangers, 2008)
 Deep Grave Dungeons, split with Crucifier, Throneum and Sathanas (Time Before Time, 2008)

Compilations
 Chainsaw Execution (Sombre, 2001)
 The Unholy Trinity (Witchhammer, 2007)
 Chainsaw Destruction (12 Years on the Bottom of a Bottle) (Terranis, 2007)

References

External links
 Bestial Mockery Official 
 Bestial Mockery @ Myspace
 Bestial Mockery biography @ Rockdetector
 Interviews: Bestial Mockery, Necromaniac, Issue No. 5

Swedish black metal musical groups
Swedish thrash metal musical groups
Musical groups established in 1995
Musical groups disestablished in 2008
Musical quintets
Season of Mist artists